The following is a chronological list of classical music composers living and working in Ireland, or originating from Ireland.

Renaissance
 Cormac MacDermott (died 1618)
 Ruaidri Dáll Ó Catháin (c.1580–c.1653)
 Nicholas Dáll Pierce (c.1561–1653)

Baroque
 Johann Sigismund Kusser (1660–1727)
 Thomas Roseingrave (c.1690–1766)
 Henry Madin (1698–1748) born in France to Irish parents

Galant period
 Kane O'Hara (c.1711–1782)
 Francis Ireland (1721–1784)
 Tommaso Giordani (c.1733–1806)
 Richard Woodward (c.1743–1777)

Classical
 Charles Thomas Carter (c.1735–1804)
 Charles Clagget (1740–c.1795)
 Philip Cogan (1750–1833)
 John Andrew Stevenson (1761–1833)
 Michael Kelly (1762–1826)
 Peter K. Moran (1767–1831)
 Thomas Carter (1769–1800)
 Thomas Augustine Geary (1775–1801)

Romantic
 Thomas Simpson Cooke (1782–1848)
 John Field (1782–1837)
 William Henry Kearns (1794–1846)
 William Michael Rooke (1794–1847)
 Joseph Augustine Wade (1796–1845)
 Samuel Lover (1797–1868)
 George Alexander Osborne (1806–1893)
 Michael William Balfe (1808–1870)
 Richard Michael Levey (1811–1899)
 W. Vincent Wallace (1812–1865)
 John William Glover (1815–1899)
 Joseph Robinson (1815–1898)
 Wellington Guernsey (1817–1885)
 Robert Prescott Stewart (1825–1894)
 Joseph O'Kelly (1828–1885)
 Patrick Gilmore (1829–1892)

Late Romantic
 Arthur O'Leary (1834–1919)
 George William Torrance (1835–1907)
 James Lynam Molloy (1837–1909)
 Charles Villiers Stanford (1852–1924)
 T. R. G. Jozé (1853–1924)
 Michele Esposito (1855–1929)
 Arthur Hervey (1855–1922)
 Paul McSwiney (1856–1890)
 Hope Temple (1859–1938)
 Thomas O'Brien Butler (1861–1915)
 Alicia Adelaide Needham (1863–1945)
 Charles Wood (1866–1926)
 Hamilton Harty (1879–1941)

Early twentieth century
 Robert O'Dwyer (1862–1949)
 Swan Hennessy (1866–1929)
 Carl Hardebeck (1869–1945)
 Mary Dickenson-Auner (1880–1965)
 Herbert Hughes (1882–1937)
 Geoffrey Molyneux Palmer (1882–1957)
 John F. Larchet (1884–1967)
 Ina Boyle (1889–1967)
 Ernest John Moeran (1894–1950)
 Arthur Duff (1899–1956)
 Rhoda Coghill (1903–2000)
 Éamonn Ó Gallchobhair (1906–1982)
 Joan Trimble (1915–2000)

Mid- to late twentieth century
 Howard Ferguson (1908–1999)
 Michael Bowles (1909–1998)
 Aloys Fleischmann (1910–1992)
 Frederick May (1911–1985)
 Walter Beckett (1914–1996)
 Brian Boydell (1917–2000)
 T.C. Kelly (1917–1985)
 Havelock Nelson (1917–1996)
 A. J. Potter (1918–1980)
 Gerard Victory (1921–1995)
 James Wilson (1922–2005)
 Hormoz Farhat (1929–2021)
 Seán Ó Riada (1931–1971)
 John Kinsella (1932–2021)
 Seóirse Bodley (born 1933)

Contemporary
 Frank Corcoran (born 1944)
 Jerome de Bromhead (born 1945)
 Jane O'Leary (born 1946)
 Philip Martin (born 1947)
 Shaun Davey (born 1948)
 Roger Doyle (born 1949)
 Kevin Volans (born 1949)
 Bill Whelan (born 1950)
 John Buckley (born 1951)
 Philip Hammond (born 1951)
 Gerald Barry (born 1952)
 Raymond Deane (born 1953)
 Eibhlís Farrell (born 1953)
 John Wolf Brennan (born 1954)
 Patrick Cassidy (born 1956)
 Rhona Clarke (born 1958)
 Ronan Guilfoyle (born 1958)
 Fergus Johnston (born 1959)
 Michael Alcorn (born 1962)
 Vincent Kennedy (born 1962)
 Michael McGlynn (born 1964)
 John McLachlan (born 1964)
 Ian Wilson (born 1964)
 Benjamin Dwyer (born 1965)
 Gráinne Mulvey (born 1966)
 Deirdre Gribbin (born 1967)
 Siobhán Cleary (born 1970)
 Donnacha Dennehy (born 1970)
 Jennifer Walshe (born 1974)
 Ed Bennett (born 1975)
 David Flynn (born 1977)
 Eoin O'Keeffe (born 1979)
 Seán Clancy (born 1984)
 Seán Doherty (born 1987)

Irish
Irish classical composers
Irish music history